John Colin McCormack (2 December 1941 – 19 June 2004) was a Welsh actor who enjoyed success in classical stage performances and television shows including BBC TV's Dixon of Dock Green, a show he returned to twenty years later when he played a police constable. McCormack also appeared in several feature films during his career.

McCormack was probably best known for his recurring role as Alan in the 1984 science fiction series Chocky and for playing Kevin Masters in EastEnders.

McCormack's electric presence and square jaw coupled with his imposing athletic build usually saw him typecast as a soldier or policeman. He nonetheless appeared in a wide range of roles including Man About the House, The Good Life and Yes, Minister. He also tutored and coached at the Guildhall School of Music and Drama where his students included Ewan McGregor, Daniel Craig and Damian Lewis.

McCormack died of cancer aged 62 after a short illness, following a tour of Romeo and Juliet in Hong Kong with the Royal Shakespeare Company.

History

Early life and career
McCormack was born in Penarth near Cardiff in Glamorgan, Wales on 2 December 1941, during the Second World War, the eldest son of a railway worker. Educated at Kings College, a private junior school in Cardiff and Penarth Grammar School he appeared in several school plays and also joined the local Victoria Youth Drama Group, appearing in several amateur productions and drama competitions. While still in school, at the age of fourteen in 1955, he was chosen after an audition to play a young crime victim on an early episode of BBC TV's Dixon of Dock Green.

McCormack was a keen, accomplished rugby player. In later years he became a squash player.

On leaving grammar school McCormack initially chose to attend an arts course at Cardiff Art College. Despite these early studies, acting remained his first love and he eventually secured a place at the Central School of Speech and Drama in London as a further step towards a professional acting career.

His first professional stage performance came in 1964 as a member of the Bristol Old Vic repertory company when he appeared in the play Bartholomew Fair followed by dozens of ensemble productions over the next few years.

Stage appearances

Royal Shakespeare Company
His work at the Old Vic came to the attention of the Royal Shakespeare Company. In 1967 he was invited to join them at their Stratford upon Avon headquarters and he remained associated with them until his death. His first appearance with the Royal Shakespeare Company at Stratford was as a citizen in Coriolanus and during his first full season with the company he went on to play a courtier in Trevor Nunn's production of The Revenger's Tragedy, the First Suitor in All's Well That Ends Well, Donalbain in Peter Hall's production of Macbeth, and Third Musician in Romeo and Juliet.

In the 1970s he played Angus in Macbeth at the Aldwych Theatre, London, Udy in Howard Barker's The Hang of the Gaol, Florence in The Adventures of Awful Knawful at the Warehouse Theatre during 1978 and Chachava in The Caucasian Chalk Circle. The decade ended with McCormack playing Borachio in Much Ado About Nothing in a Royal Shakespeare Company UK tour that started in the Autumn of 1979 and continued over into the spring of 1980.

The 1980 season continued with McCormack taking four different roles in Barker's The Loud Boy's Life when he played Costall, Dampsing, Streatham, and Imber. He starred as Macduff in the Barbican Theatre's 1988 showing of Adrian Noble's Macbeth and again in 1989. Also that year he played Mr. Hardacre in Edward Bond's play Restoration, Sebastian in The Tempest at the Royal Shakespeare Theatre, and Kent in the Almeida Theatre's King Lear directed by Cicely Berry.

The 1990s started with McCormack taking a starring role as gang member Dolin in the stage production of A Clockwork Orange at the Barbican Theatre. He returned to the Royal Shakespeare Company for the 1998 and 1999 seasons when the company alternated performances of three plays where he played Mike in Richard Nelson's Goodnight Children Everywhere, the Duke of Milan in The Two Gentlemen of Verona, and Baptista in the bawdy Elizabethan comedy The Taming of the Shrew. He reprised the last role for a small-scale Royal Shakespeare Company tour of the UK during the summer of 2000.

During the last few years of his life McCormack played the Earl of Salisbury in King John several times over the 2001 and 2002 seasons, Casca in Julius Caesar at both the Royal Shakespeare Theatre and the Barbican, and filled three separate roles in Gregory Doran's "Season of Rarities" during the winter of 2002–2003: He was Lord Audley in Edward III, Bramble in Eastward Ho! and Pietro in The Malcontent.

Royal Court Theatre company
McCormack's occasional association with Royal Court Theatre company started in 1982 when he appeared in G.F. Newman's play Operation Bad Apple. He returned to the Royal Court in 1986 to star in the original stage production of Jim Cartwright's seminal play Road. Also that year he appeared at the Theatre Upstairs in the Royal Court's production of Andrea Dunbar's Shirley. In 1991 he took a leading role in Griselda Gambaro's Putting Two and Two Together again at the Theatre Upstairs and starred in the 1992 production of Timberlake Wertenbaker's unusual play Three Birds Alighting in a Field.

Other theatre companies
McCormack's other stage appearances include playing Islayev during the Cambridge Theatre Company's (CTC) 1987 tour of A Month in the Country and Pinchwife in The Country Wife in 1991 also with the Cambridge Theatre Company. He took on the dual roles of Chandebise and Poche in Feydeau's A Flea in Her Ear by the Welsh company "Theatr Clwyd" in 1993 and in a number of non-company appearances played Wangel in Ibsen's The Lady from the Sea at the Blackfriars Theatre in 1996, Lord Kent in the Haymarket Theatre's 1997 showing of King Lear, Estragon in Waiting for Godot in 2000 at the Mercury Theatre, Colchester.

McCormack's last UK stage appearance was as Nicholas in Harold Pinter's One for the Road at the Battersea Arts Centre during 2003. Pinter himself was particularly taken with McCormack's impressive interpretation and personally wrote to him afterwards, saying:
"I thought your Nicholas was absolutely terrific. What power and awesome lucidity."

Television roles

Filmography

Personal life
McCormack met the actress and movement specialist Wendy Allnutt while they were studying together at the Central School of Speech and Drama in 1963, and they married in 1968 after they had both graduated. They remained married until his death in 2004 and had two children, Katherine and Andrew.

Throughout his stage and television career McCormack still found time to cultivate a lifelong interest, expertise and extensive knowledge in historic churches and medieval architecture.

Death
In late 2003 McCormack was playing Lord Capulet in a tour of Hong Kong with the Royal Shakespeare Company's Romeo and Juliet when he first started to feel unwell. On his return to England he consulted doctors and learned that he had cancer.  He died in hospital in June 2004.

References

External links
 

People from Penarth
Welsh male film actors
Welsh male stage actors
Welsh male television actors
Alumni of the Royal Central School of Speech and Drama
Welsh male Shakespearean actors
Royal Shakespeare Company members
Deaths from cancer in England
1941 births
2004 deaths